Stefan Schneider (born July 11, 1975) is a Swiss former professional ice hockey defenceman who played in the Swiss National League A with SC Bern (1993–94, 1994–95, and 1998–99) and Lausanne HC (1995–96).

He is currently the head coach of Unterseen-Interlaken in the Switzerland3.

References

External links

1975 births
Living people
Lausanne HC players
SC Bern players
Swiss ice hockey defencemen